Vincent Ribeton is a French Roman Catholic priest of the Priestly Fraternity of St. Peter (FSSP) and current rector of the International Seminary of St. Peter in Wigratzbad, Germany.  He previously served as district superior of France for the FSSP from 2006 to 2015.

A Frenchman from the Basque Country, Ribeton holds a notarial master in history of law and studied theology at the International Seminary of St. Peter in Wigratzbad, where he is now rector.  He also studied at L'Institut Saint-Thomas-d'Aquin (ISTA) in Toulouse, France. In France he exerted pastoral ministries in Saint-Etienne and later as hospital chaplain in Toulouse. He also served as chaplain of the community of faithful entrusted to the Fraternity in Clermont, Landes by the bishop of Aire-et-Dax from 2004 until assuming his post as district superior.

References

External links 
Priestly Fraternity of St. Peter – International website with pages in English, French, German, Spanish, Portuguese, Italian, Polish, and Latin
French-speaking District of the F.S.S.P 
Organizational chart of F.S.S.P. leadership

1968 births
Living people
People from the Northern Basque Country
French Roman Catholic priests
Priestly Fraternity of St. Peter
French traditionalist Catholics